Dunkley is a surname. Notable people with the surname include:

 Albert Dunkley (1877–1949), English professional footballer
 Andrew Dunkley (born 1968), Australian rules footballer
 Archibald Dunkley, Rastafarian preacher
 Errol Dunkley (born 1951), Jamaican reggae musician
 John Dunkley (1891–1947), Jamaican painter and sculptor
 Josh Dunkley (born 1997), Australian rules footballer, son of Andrew Dunkley
 Julien Dunkley (born 1975), Jamaican track and field athlete
 Kenneth J. Dunkley (born 1939), American inventor.
 Lorna Dunkley (born 1972), British television news presenter
 Louisa Margaret Dunkley (1866–1927), Australian labor organizer
 Philip Dunkley (born 1951), English cricketer

See also
Division of Dunkley, Victoria, Australia - named for Louisa Margaret Dunkley
Dunckley, Colorado
Dunckley Pass, Colorado
Dorothy Dunckley (1890–1972), Australian make-up artist etc.
Henry Dunckley (1823–1896), English Baptist minister, journalist and newspaper editor
Dunkerley (disambiguation)